Afrodísio Pereira de Castro often known as A.P. Castro (1893–1975) was a Brazilian cinematographer who worked on more than fifty films during his career. Occasionally he also worked as a sound recordist or a film editor.

Selected filmography
 Ganga Bruta (1933)
 Hello, Hello Brazil! (1935)
 Hello, Hello, Carnival! (1936)
 Samba in Berlin (1943)
 Berlin to the Samba Beat (1944)

References

Bibliography 
 Flórido, Eduardo Giffoni. Great characters in the history of Brazilian cinema. Fraiha, 1999.

External links 
 

1893 births
1975 deaths
Brazilian cinematographers
Brazilian film editors
People from Bahia
Place of death missing